John B. Connally High School is a public secondary school in Austin, Texas, United States. The school, which opened in 1996, serves 9-12 and is part of the Pflugerville Independent School District.

The 5A high school is home to 1,933 students and 208 staff members who have worked to create an inclusive environment which welcomes a diverse group of students from a variety of backgrounds.

Athletics

Football
Since first opening, Pflugerville's Connally High School has been known as a powerhouse in the 4-A district throughout Texas. Perhaps one of the most memorable seasons, as quoted by Austin American-Statesman, was the 04-05 season, where the Cougars for the first time made it to the State Semi-Finals Championship round in the playoffs, losing by a score of 10 to 7 to Kilgore High School putting up an impressive record of 11-4. The program never had less than 8 wins in a season before switching from head coach Matt Monzingo to head coach Howard McMahan, going 7-4 the following season. After the move to the 5-A district after the 07-08 season, the football program plummeted significantly managing a horrible 3-7 record in the 08-09 season followed by an even worse 2-8 record in the 09-10 season. The 08-09 season marked the end of the Cougars streak of making the UIL State Playoffs Tournament for 11 years. Connally moved back into the 4-A district for the 10-11 season, earning a 10-2 record in a very competitive district.

Baseball
The baseball program at Pflugerville's Connally High School was established in 1997, a year after the opening of the high school. Typically known as a program who remains sluggish until the start of district play, the baseball team has had sustain success since the 2002-2003 school year. That team was led by seniors Austin Boggs Texas A&M University and Andy Morrison Southwestern University. The team made it all the UIL Regional Finals before losing to Brenham High School. The following year brought success as well. The 2003-2004 team was led by seniors MLB prospect Greg Golson New York Yankees and Drew Bias Baylor University. The '03-'04 team had an early exit from the UIL playoffs to the same Brenham High School from the previous year. The 2004-2005 kept up the track record of winning by repeating what the previous teams accomplished. The team was led by seniors Mason Dixon Texas A&M International and the unknown emergence of Brandon Gamble Blinn College. The team defeated Austin Lanier High School in the 1st Round of the UIL Playoffs and was defeated in the next round by Dripping Springs High School. The 2005 - 2006 team did the same as previous years and made it to the 2nd round of the playoffs by beating Austin LBJ and falling short to the eventual Texas State Champions, New Braunfels High School. The team was led by Santos Reyes Southwestern University.  Ryan Sasaki, a high school senior, was drafted by the Philadelphia Phillies in 2009. The following year, senior Anthony Bryant was drafted by the St. Louis Cardinals.

Basketball
Though never reaching any major success, (The basketball  program went to state in 2007 lost to Dallas South Oak Cliff), the Cougar Men's Basketball team have been a very talented group over the years, although the 09-10 season had been, by record, one of the worst in school history.

The Cougar Women's Basketball team has experienced mixed success. However, both the 03-04 and 04-05 teams went to the State Semi-finals. Led by coach Angie Hermesmeyer (University of Texas-Austin alum), the Lady Cougars have never had a losing season. Coach Hermesmeyer was recently replaced by Laura Zouzalik, who has been coaching for twenty-four years.

Soccer
The men's soccer class of 2009 brought statewide recognition to the program by becoming the first 4A high school, to move up in classes (5A) and a win a District Title undefeated. The team was led by senior midfielder Marco Alcocer (Clemson) and sophomore goalie Brooks Grubbs to an unprecedented 5A district title. The team went on to the Regional Finals that year in playoffs (2-0 victory over New Braunfels; 2-0 victory over San Antonio Marshall; 4-1 victory over San Antonio Warren; 1-0 Victory over La Joya in shootouts) and ended up losing to Brownsville Lopez, who later advanced to the state final. Head Coach John Mark Edwards was in his first year of coaching boys high school soccer and also was awarded with the Coach of the Year award by the district coaches. Cross town rival Pflugerville High School lost in the first round of the playoffs.

References

External links

John B. Connally High School

High schools in Travis County, Texas
Public high schools in Texas
1996 establishments in Texas
Educational institutions established in 1996